Finland was the host nation for the 1952 Summer Olympics in Helsinki. 258 competitors, 228 men and 30 women, took part in 139 events in 18 sports.  The nation won 22 medals.

Athletics

Basketball

Men's Team Competition
Main Round (Group B)
 Lost to Mexico (48-66)
 Lost to Soviet Union (35-47)
 Lost to Bulgaria (64-65) → did not advance, 16th place
Team Roster
Juhani Kyöstilä
Raine Nuutinen
Raimo Lindholm
Timo Suviranta
Kauko Heinänen
Pentti Laaksonen
Oiva Virtanen
Esko Karhunen
Eero Salonen
Pertti Mutru
Tuomo Ristola
Tapio Pöyhönen

Boxing

Canoeing

Cycling

Road Competition
Men's Individual Road Race (190.4 km)
Raino Koskenkorva — 5:23:34.6 (→ 42nd place)
Paul Backman — did not finish (→ no ranking)
Paul Nyman — did not finish (→ no ranking)
Ruben Forsblom — did not finish (→ no ranking)

Track Competition
Men's 1.000m Time Trial
Onni Kasslin
 Final — 1:15.3 (→ 14th place)

Men's 1.000m Sprint Scratch Race
Helge Törn — 27th and last place

Diving

Men's 3m Springboard
Helge Vasenius
 Preliminary Round — 65.41 points (→ 14th place)
Olavi Heinonen
 Preliminary Round — 58.06 points (→ 29th place)

Equestrian

Fencing

11 fencers, 8 men and 3 women, represented Finland in 1952.

Men's foil
 Kurt Lindeman
 Heikki Raitio

Men's épée
 Erkki Kerttula
 Rolf Wiik
 Heikki Raitio

Men's team épée
 Kauko Jalkanen, Erkki Kerttula, Rolf Wiik, Nils Sjöblom, Jaakko Vuorinen, Paavo Miettinen

Women's foil
 Maggie Kalka
 Marianne Sjöblom
 Taimi Mattsson

Football

Gymnastics

Hockey

Modern pentathlon

Three male pentathletes represented Finland in 1952, winning bronze in the team event.

Individual
 Ole Mannonen
 Lauri Vilkko
 Olavi Rokka

Team
 Ole Mannonen
 Lauri Vilkko
 Olavi Rokka

Rowing

Finland had 26 male rowers participate in all seven rowing events in 1952.

 Men's single sculls
 Sevi Holmsten

 Men's double sculls
 Keijo Koivumäki
 Eero Koivumäki

 Men's coxless pair
 Bengt Ahlström
 Stig Winter

 Men's coxed pair
 Veijo Mikkolainen
 Toimi Pitkänen
 Erkki Lyijynen (cox)

 Men's coxless four
 Veikko Lommi
 Kauko Wahlsten
 Oiva Lommi
 Lauri Nevalainen

 Men's coxed four
 Kurt Grönholm
 Paul Stråhlman
 Birger Karlsson
 Karl-Erik Johansson
 Antero Tukiainen (cox)

 Men's eight
 Tor Lundsten
 Birger Andersson
 Eero Lehtovirta
 Yrjö Hakoila
 Antti Arell
 Harry Wikman
 Esko Lyytikkä
 Klaus Lampi
 Toivo Räsänen (cox)

Sailing

Shooting

Eleven shooters represented Finland in 1952. Vilho Ylönen won a silver medal in the 50 m rifle, three positions and Tauno Mäki won a bronze medal in the 100m running deer.

25 m pistol
 Pentti Linnosvuo
 Veli-Jussi Hölsö

50 m pistol
 Klaus Lahti
 Oiva Tylli

300 m rifle, three positions
 Vilho Ylönen
 Pauli Janhonen

50 m rifle, three positions
 Vilho Ylönen
 Kullervo Leskinen

50 m rifle, prone
 Kullervo Leskinen
 Vilho Ylönen

100m running deer
 Tauno Mäki
 Yrjö Miettinen

Trap
 Konrad Huber
 Sven-Erik Rosenlew

Swimming

Weightlifting

Wrestling

References

External links

Official Olympic Reports
International Olympic Committee results database

Nations at the 1952 Summer Olympics
1952
1952 in Finnish sport